La Carballeda is a comarca located in the northwest of the province of Zamora, Castilla y León, western Spain. Its area is 1,216.54 km².

Despite of the strong identity of its inhabitants, this historical region has not been able to achieve the necessary legal recognition for its administrative development. Therefore its municipalities have resorted to organizing themselves in mancomunidad, the only legal formula that has allowed the region to manage its public municipal resources meaningfully. The capital of the province is Mombuey and the most populated town is Villardeciervos, even though its population is only 491. The name 'La Carballeda' originated in the great number of Quercus robur oaks, locally known as carballos, in the comarca.

The Sierra de la Culebra mountain range, one of the few areas in Western Europe having a sizeable population of wild wolves, is located in the southwest of the comarca.

Municipalities 
Some of the villages included in the historical comarca are part of municipalities which are now included the Sanabria comarca.
 Cernadilla
Anta de Tera
San Salvador de Palazuelos
Valdemerilla
 Espadañedo
Carbajales de la Encomienda
Farmamontanos de la Sierra
Letrillas
Utrera de la Encomienda
Vega del Castillo
 Justel
Quintanilla
Villalverde
 Manzanal de Arriba
Codesal
Folgoso de La Carballeda
Linarejos
Pedroso
Sagallos
Sandin
Santa Cruz de Los Cuérragos
 Manzanal de los Infantes
Donadillo
Dornillas
Lanseros
Otero de Centenos
Sejas de Sanabria
 Molezuelas de la Carballeda
 Mombuey
Fresno de la Carballeda
Valparaíso
 Muelas de los Caballeros
Donado
Gramedo
 Otero de Bodas
Val de Santa María
 Peque
 Rionegro del Puente
Santa Eulalia del Río Negro
Valleluengo
Villar de Farfón
 Villardeciervos
Cional
Manzanal de Abajo

External links 
 Ministerio de Administraciones Públicas
 Asociación Cultural Las Raíces | Codesal
 Web sobre Codesal
 Página Web de la Villa de Mombuey, Templarios en Carballeda, Mapa de la Comarca
 Ríonegro del Puente
 Página oficial de la Asociación "Diego de Losada"
 FAPAS
 Página de Ferreras de Arriba y la Sierra de la Culebra

Province of Zamora
Geography of Spain
Historical regions in Spain
Mancomunidad